Jasmine Choi (born in Seoul, South Korea) is a Korean-born flutist, educated in the US, living in Austria.

Life
Raised in Daejeon, Choi studied at the Curtis Institute of Music and the Juilliard School, where her teachers included Julius Baker and Jeffrey Khaner, from 2000 to 2004.  As a student in 2002, she was the senior division winner of the Albert M. Greenfield Student Competition, sponsored by the Philadelphia Orchestra. In 2006, Symphony Magazine included her as one of two flautists in their list of emerging artists.

Music career
A recording of her performances of Mozart's Concerto for Flute and Harp K. 299 and the Concerto for Flute K. 314 (called Jasmine Choi plays Mozart) was released in 2006 in Korea by Sony BMG. She later held the post of associate principal flute of the Cincinnati Symphony Orchestra under Paavo Järvi and principal flute of the Vienna Symphony under Fabio Luisi.

Choi served as Principal Flute of the Vienna Symphony Orchestra from May 2012 to August 2013, the first Korean-born member of the orchestra in its history.  With members of the orchestra, she made a commercial recording of flute quartets by Mozart.

Choi has transcribed the violin concerti of Mendelssohn and Tchaikovsky for flute. She has also transcribed the Introduction and Rondo Capriccioso of Saint-Saens, for flute. In addition, Choi has commercially recorded works of Claude Bolling in 2012 (Sony Classical) and the 12 Fantasies for Solo Flute by Georg Philipp Telemann (Austrian Gramophone). Mark Laycock has written a flute concerto for Choi. In 2016, she was named as Cultural Ambassador in her hometown Daejon, Korea.

Discography 
Choi's recordings include:

 Love in Paris - a live recital album, Jasmine Choi & Sangwook Park (2017)
 Trio Joy - free improvisations, Jasmine Choi, Joe Fonda, Harvey Sorgen (2017)
 The Telemann Files : 12 Fantasies for Solo Flute, Jasmine Choi (2015)
 W.A.Mozart: 5 Quartets with Flute, Jasmine Choi with members of Vienna Symphony (2013)
 Claude Bolling Suite for Flute and Jazz Trio, Jasmine Choi (2012)
 Fantasy, Jasmine Choi (2011)
 Jasmine Choi Plays Mozart, Jasmine Choi (2006) (only released in Korea)

References

External links
 

Living people
Classical flautists
South Korean classical musicians
Curtis Institute of Music alumni
Juilliard School alumni
Women flautists
21st-century women musicians
Year of birth missing (living people)
21st-century flautists